Henric Schartau (27 September 1757 – 3 February 1825) was a Swedish Lutheran pietistic priest. His theology, including his characteristic teachings on the "order of grace", influenced a revivalist movement known as Schartauanism.

Biography 
Schartau was born in Malmö in 1757. His father was a member of Riksdag (Parliament); his mother died from black fever when he was thirteen. Schartau's father then pushed for him to be allowed to graduate at the age of 14 so he could attend university. His father later died after difficult political and financial circumstances. Schartau's paternal grandfather was the vicar of Sörby, Jöns Schartau (1684–1754), who took his surname from Skartofta, the village where he was born. He remembered his maternal grandfather as being a positive religious influence on him, later writing: "In my associations with him I soon experienced the sweetness of being in the house of my heavenly Father. This experience helped to bring me back, after I had for some time during my youth drifted away."

Schartau studied at Lund University and graduated with a bachelor's degree in philosophy in 1774. At the age of twenty, he went through a religious crisis. Christian Scriver's  ('The Soul's Treasure') played a role in helping him through it, which led him to a focus on the Bible; he then went through a period in which he was influenced by Moravian teachings.

In 1778 he received his master's degree. In 1780 he was ordained a priest in Kalmar, where he served as house preacher to Privy Councillor  and as a private instructor at Danerum in Ryssby.
After serving as a military chaplain, he became second assistant vicar at Lund Cathedral in 1785. On 22 November 1786 he married Catharina (Cajsa) Elisabeth Sommelius.

Schartau's beliefs were pietistic along the lines of August Hermann Francke and Philipp Spener. By 1787, however, Schartau found himself a harsh critic of Moravianism and its emotionalism as well as its separatism. He believed in staying within the bounds of the existing state church and in a more intellectual form of faith.

In 1793 he became assistant vicar at the cathedral and vicar of Bjällerup and Stora Råby parishes in Scania, southern Sweden, a post he held until his death. He also served as rural dean.

Schartau became renowned for his harsh and strict sermons, which came to influence several young priests, many of them in the Diocese of Gothenburg. In the United States they were influential in western Maine.

 He gathered audiences from all walks of life, although professors were initially largely absent from his services and hearings.

His influence extended to preachers such as Gerhard Gerhardsson, Peter Fjellstedt, and those in the free church movement such as Lars Vilhelm Henschen. Some well-known Swedish bishops like Bo Giertz have also been influenced by Schartauan teachings.

Schartau died in 1825 in Lund.

Schartau also has a statue located at Lund Cathedral. The statue, made by sculptor Peter Linde, was a gift to the Cathedral Council received by Christina Odenberg and unveiled on 31 October 2003 by Archbishop K. G. Hammar. However, plans for a statue had existed for most of the 20th century.

Selected works

References

External links

 Schartau, Henrik (Schaff-Herzog Encyclopedia of Religious Knowledge)
Schartau, Henric (Christian Cyclopedia)

1757 births
1825 deaths
People from Malmö
18th-century Swedish Lutheran priests
Swedish theologians
19th-century Swedish Lutheran priests
Pietists